The Teatro Eliseo (literally "Eliseus Theater") is a theatre located in Rome, Italy. Initially named Arena Nazionale ("National Arena"), built of wood and dedicated to variety shows, over the years took on increasing importance, up to undergoing a makeover in 1938 that decreed its current appearance and name.

References

External links 
 

Theatres in Rome
Theatres completed in 1938